Antelope Creek is a stream in the U.S. state of South Dakota. It is a tributary of the Missouri River.

Antelope Creek was named for the antelope native to the territory.

See also
List of rivers of South Dakota

References

Rivers of Lyman County, South Dakota
Rivers of Stanley County, South Dakota
Rivers of South Dakota